Events in the year 1945 in Turkey.

Parliament
 7th Parliament of Turkey

Incumbents
President – İsmet İnönü 
Prime Minister – Şükrü Saracoğlu

Ruling party
  Ruling party – Republican People's Party (CHP)

Cabinet
14th government of Turkey

Events
3 January – End of diplomatic relations with Japan.
10 January – Ottoman Turkish wording of the constitution was changed to modern Turkish (to be reverted in 1952)
23 February – Declaration of war against Germany and Japan
12 June – Motion with four signatures by Celal Bayar, Adnan Menderes, Refik Koraltan and Fuat Köprülü. Serious opposition in CHP 
26 June – Turkey joined the United Nations
5 September – National Development Party was founded
21 October – Census (population 18,790,174)
20 November – Earthquake in Van

Births

8 January – Kadir Topbaş, politician and architect (d. 2021)
5 April – Cem Karaca, singer (d. 2004)
20 June – Murat Sökmenoğlu, politician
22 June – Yaşar Nuri Öztürk, theologist and politician
15 November – Ferdi Tayfur, singer
20 November – Emel Sayın, singer
30 November – Ayşen Gruda, theatre actress

Deaths
9 January – Osman Cemal Kaygılı (born in 1890), writer
27 March – Halit Ziya Uşaklıgil (born in 1866) writer
28 June – Yunus Nadi Abalıoğlu (born in 1879), journalist
22 September – Mürsel Bakü (born in 1881), retired general

Gallery

References

 
Years of the 20th century in Turkey
Turkey
Turkey
Turkey